Military Region Command II/Sriwijaya is an Indonesian Army Regional Military Command that covers the provinces of Bengkulu, Jambi, South Sumatra, Bangka-Belitung Islands and Lampung. 

Starting from the existence of armed organizations that ever existed in South Sumatera, such as the People's Security Body Guards (BPKR), later transformed into the People's Security Agency (TKR) within Southern Sumatra, form part of the long lineage held by the regional command. The command  is named after the legendary kingdom of Srivijaya.

Name variations 
 January 1, 1946: named Sub-commandment South Sumatra
 January 10, 1946: named Division VII / Garuda
 July 1, 1946: back to Sub commandment South Sumatra which oversees the four Territories of Palembang, Jambi, Bengkulu and Lampung
 July 29, 1950: based on the decision of Army Chief of Staff Number: 83/KSAD/Pati/1950, Territorial Army Command (TT) II / Sriwijaya
 February 1, 1961: Military Region Command IV / Sriwijaya
 February 12, 1985:  Military Region Command II/Sriwijaya by Army Chief of Staff Decree No. Skep/346/II/1985

Area Commands 
Military Region Command II/Sriwijaya is divided into 5 Area Commands (Komando Resor Militer / Korem),  30 District Commands (Komando Distrik Militer / Kodim), 228 District Sectors (Komando Rayon Militer / Koramil) and 1832 Babinsa personnel or Subsector Commands that operate at Kelurahan level.

Korem 041/Garuda Emas (Gamas), covers the area of Bengkulu Province
 Kodim 0407/Bengkulu City
 Kodim 0408/Bengkulu South
 Kodim 0409/Rejang Lebong
 Kodim 0423/Bengkulu North
 Kodim 0425/Seluma
 Kodim 0428/Mukomuko
 144th Infantry Battalion/Jaya Yudha
Korem 042/Garuda Putih (Gapu), covers the area of Jambi Province
 Kodim 0415/Batanghari
 Kodim 0416/Bungo Tebo
 Kodim 0417/Kerinci
 Kodim 0419/Tanjung Jabung
 Kodim 0420/Sarolangun Bangko
 142nd Special Raider Infantry Battalion/Satria Jaya
Korem 043/Garuda Hitam (Gatam), covers the area of Lampung Province
 Kodim 0410/Lampung City
 Kodim 0411/Central Lampung 
 Kodim 0412/Northern Lampung
 Kodim 0421/South Lampung
 Kodim 0422/Western Lampung 
 Kodim 0424/Tanggamus
 Kodim 0426/Tulang Bawang
 Kodim 0427/Way Kanan
 Kodim 0429/East Lampung
 143rd Special Raider Infantry Battalion/Triwira Eka Jaya

Korem 044/Garuda Dempo (Gapo), covers the area of South Sumatra Province
 Kodim 0401/Muba
 Kodim 0402/Oki
 Kodim 0403/Oku
 Kodim 0404/Muara Enim
 Kodim 0405/Lahat
 Kodim 0406/Musi Rawas
 Kodim 0418/Palembang
 Kodim 0430/Banyuasin
 141st Infantry Battalion/Aneka Yudha
Korem 045/Garuda Jaya (Gaya), covers the area of Bangka Belitung Islands Province
 Kodim 0413/Bangka Island
 Kodim 0414/Belitung Island
 Kodim 0431/Western Bangka

Training regiment 
The 2nd Regional Training Regiment (Resimen Induk Kodam II/Sirwijaya) serves as the training regiment for new recruits to the territorial command. It is organized as follows:

 Regiment HQ
 TC II/Sriwijaya NCO School
 Basic Combat Training Center
 National Defense Training Command 
 Specialist Training School 
 Enlisted Personnel Training Unit

Battalions
 8th Infantry Brigade/Garuda Cakti (flagged for activation)
 Brigade HQ
 145th Infantry Battalion (Batalyon Infanteri)
 146th Infantry Battalion
 200th Raider Infantry Battalion/Bhakti Negara
 5th Cavalry Squadron (Batalyon Kavaleri / Yonkav)/Serbu Dwipangga Ceta
 5th Armored Cavalry Troop/Graha Ceta Cakti
 2nd Combat Engineers Battalion (Batalyon Zeni Tempur / Yon Zipur)/Samara Grawira
 105th Field Artillery Battalion/Cailendra
 12th Air Defense Artillery Battalion/Satria Bhuana Prakasa
 14th Combat Engineers Detachment/Gana Bhadrika

Support units
 TC II/Sriwijaya Military Police Command (Pomdam II/Sriwjaya)
 TC II/Sriwijaya Public Relations Bureau (Pendam II/Sriwjaya)
 TC II/Sriwijaya Adjutant General's Office (Anjendam II/Sriwjaya)
 TC II/Sriwijaya Military Physical Fitness and Sports Bureau (Jasdam II/Sriwjaya)
 TC II/Sriwijaya Medical Department (Kesdam II/Sriwjaya)
 TC II/Sriwijaya Veterans and National Reserves Administration (Babiminvetcadam II/Sriwjaya)
 TC II/Sriwijaya Topography Service (Topdam II/Sriwjaya)
 TC II/Sriwijaya Chaplaincy Corps (Bintaldam II/Sriwjaya)
 TC II/Sriwijaya Finance Office (Kudam II/Sriwjaya)
 TC II/Sriwijaya Legal Affairs (Kumdam II/Sriwjaya)
 TC II/Sriwijaya HQ and HQ Services Detachment (Denmadam II/Sriwjaya)
 TC II/Sriwijaya Information and Communications Technology Oiffice (Infolahtadam II/Sriwjaya)
 TC II/Sriwijaya Supply Corps (Bekangdam II/Sriwjaya)
 TC II/Sriwijaya Transportation Corps (Hubdam II/Sriwjaya)
 TC II/Sriwijaya Ordnance Corps (Paldam III/Siliwangi)
 TC II/Sriwijaya Engineers Command (Zidam II/Sriwjaya)
 TC II/Sriwijaya Signals Unit (Sandidam II/Sriwjaya)
 TC II/Sriwijaya Intelligence Detachment (Deninteldam II/Sriwjaya)

References

External links 
 Kodam II / Sriwijaya (Official Site)
 Indonesian Army official website (in Indonesian)

Military of Indonesia
Military units and formations of Indonesia
02
Palembang
Sumatra
Military units and formations established in 1946
Indonesian Army